Daniel William Owens (born March 16, 1967) is a former American football defensive lineman.

Professional career
Owens played for the Detroit Lions and Atlanta Falcons between 1990 and 1999 and amassed 33 career sacks.

In his last season with the Lions, he started at defensive tackle.  He was a solid starter, even though he probably didn't even weigh 290 pounds.  He got hurt in week 9 and was lost for the season.  Unfortunately for Owens, this injury at his age ended his career.

College career
Owens played college football at the University of Southern California where he was All-Pac-10 in 1989.

Personal life
Owens is married to his wife Susie and has four children; Lainey, Mackenzie, Connor, and Haley. He is also part owner of The Forum Athletic Club in Johns Creek, Georgia.  He currently serves as the defensive coordinator for the Northview High School football team.

American football defensive ends
American football defensive tackles
USC Trojans football players
Atlanta Falcons players
Detroit Lions players
1967 births
Living people
Sportspeople from Whittier, California
Ed Block Courage Award recipients